The OVO Hydro (previously known as "SSE Hydro") has been the busiest entertainment venue in Glasgow and Scotland since its opening in 2013. Many local, regional and international artists have performed at the venue, spanning a wide range of musical genres. A list of notable concerts are given in the table below, with other non-concert entertainment events also included. All events are arranged in an chronological order.

Entertainment events

2013–present

TV and award shows 
Apart from entertainment events, the arena has also been a recording location for the musical competition The X Factor and hosted the MOBO Awards in 2013. The BBC sports personality of the year was held at the venue in 2014 to coincide with Glasgow hosting the commonwealth games.

Festivals 
In 2018, the Hydro became host of the Scotland leg of the C2C: Country to Country festival. The event, one of Europe's most popular country music festivals, takes place simultaneously in Glasgow, London and Dublin and features a host of successful American artists, many of whom are giving rare UK performances. In 2016 and 2017, the festival was hosted by the Clyde Auditorium. Little Big Town, Tim McGraw & Faith Hill and Kacey Musgraves headlined the event in 2018, while the 2019 edition will be headlined by Chris Stapleton, Keith Urban and Lady Antebellum, who previously played the Hydro as part of their You Look Good World Tour in 2017.

Notes

References 

Entertainment events at SSE Hydro
Entertainment events in the United Kingdom
Events in Glasgow
Entertainment events at SSE Hydro
Lists of events by venue
Lists of events in the United Kingdom